Maria Berny, née Waćkowska (born 7 August 1932, in Trościanka, Wołyń) is a Polish politician, activist and senator of the 3rd and 5th republic in Poland.

Biography 
She graduated from the pedagogiczne high school in Krzeszowice and for 12 years she worked as a teacher. In 1970 she graduated from the Faculty of Philosophy and History at the University of Wrocław. She managed the Press and Book Lovers Club in Wrocław. Berny also worked in the Art Exhibitions Bureau. In 2000, she was one of the co-founders of the Association for Citizen Safety Support and a member of the Association of Active and Creative Women in Wrocław.

She was a member to PZPR, then to SDRP, in 1999 joined the SLD. In the years 1993-1997 she was a senator representing the Wrocław voivodship. From 1998 to 2001 she was the councillor of the Lower Silesian Seym. She was again elected senator in 2001 from the Wrocław district. In March 2004, she decamped to the Social Democracy of Poland.

In 2005 she was not re-elected.

Decorations 
 Officer of the Order of Polonia Restituta by President Aleksander Kwaśniewski in 1998.

References 

1932 births
Living people
People from Volyn Oblast
People from Wołyń Voivodeship (1921–1939)
Members of the Senate of Poland 1993–1997
University of Wrocław alumni
Officers of the Order of Polonia Restituta
Members of the Senate of Poland 2001–2005